Colpodium chionogeiton is a species of grass in the family Poaceae. It is found in Kenya and Tanzania. Its natural habitat is alpine wetlands.

References

chionogeiton
Flora of Kenya
Flora of Tanzania
Vulnerable flora of Africa
Taxonomy articles created by Polbot